Milhars is a commune in the Tarn department in southern France.

Geography
The river Cérou flows into the Aveyron in the commune, 1.4 km north to the village itself.

See also
Communes of the Tarn department

References

Communes of Tarn (department)